Fatima Sana (born 8 November 2001) is a Pakistani cricketer who plays primarily as a right-arm medium-fast bowler for Pakistan. She has played domestic cricket for Karachi, Zarai Taraqiati Bank Limited and Barbados Royals. In April 2019, she was named in Pakistan's squad for their series against South Africa. She made her Women's One Day International (WODI) debut for Pakistan against South Africa on 6 May 2019. She made her Women's Twenty20 International (WT20I) debut for Pakistan against South Africa on 15 May 2019. In January 2020, she was named in Pakistan's squad for the 2020 ICC Women's T20 World Cup in Australia. In December 2020, she was shortlisted as one of the Women's Emerging Cricketer of the Year for the 2020 PCB Awards.

In June 2021, Sana was part of Pakistan's squad that toured the West Indies. In the final match of the tour, Fatima Sana  took her first five-wicket haul in WODIs, with 5/39. In October 2021, she was named in Pakistan's team for the 2021 Women's Cricket World Cup Qualifier tournament in Zimbabwe. In January 2022, she was named in Pakistan's team for the 2022 Women's Cricket World Cup in New Zealand. In May 2022, she was named in Pakistan's team for the cricket tournament at the 2022 Commonwealth Games in Birmingham, England. In August 2022, she was signed as an overseas player for Barbados Royals for the inaugural edition of the Women's Caribbean Premier League.

Awards 
 ICC Women's Emerging Cricketer of the Year 2021 award

References

External links
 
 

2001 births
Living people
Cricketers from Karachi
Pakistani women cricketers
Pakistan women One Day International cricketers
Pakistan women Twenty20 International cricketers
Karachi women cricketers
Zarai Taraqiati Bank Limited women cricketers
Barbados Royals (WCPL) cricketers
Cricketers at the 2022 Commonwealth Games
Commonwealth Games competitors for Pakistan